Hill Railway Station Road is a road within the suburb of Air Itam near George Town in Penang, Malaysia. Designated as Route , it leads to the Penang Hill Lower Railway Station at the foot of Penang Hill.

References  

Roads in Penang
George Town, Penang